Koppamurra is a locality located within the Naracoorte Lucindale Council in the Limestone Coast region of South Australia.

References

Limestone Coast